Işıklar is a village in Dursunbey District, Balıkesir Province, Turkey.

References 

Villages in Dursunbey District